Nuci is a commune in the northeastern part of Ilfov County, Muntenia, Romania. Its name means "walnut trees" in Romanian. It is composed of five villages: Balta Neagră, Merii Petchii, Micșuneștii Mari, Micșuneștii-Moară and Nuci.

The commune is located in the northeastern corner of the county, bordering Prahova County and Ialomița County.

Natives
 Gheorghe Chivu

References

Communes in Ilfov County
Localities in Muntenia